The English Steel Corporation Ltd was a United Kingdom steel producer.  The company was jointly owned by Cammell Laird and Vickers and was formed to bring together their basic steel making interests, principally in the Sheffield area but also including a plant in Openshaw, Manchester.

The company was nationalised in 1951, becoming part of the Iron and Steel Corporation of Great Britain, was denationalised shortly afterwards, and renationalised and was absorbed into British Steel Corporation in 1967. It was then subsequently privatised. Eventually the present business was acquired by a management buy out in 2005 and is now called Sheffield Forgemasters.

For more information see the constituent companies articles.

Sources
 Whitaker's Almanack (various dates)

External links
 http://www.gracesguide.co.uk/English_Steel_Corporation
 A 1939 Flight advertisement for the English Steel Corporation (ESC)
 

Defunct manufacturing companies of the United Kingdom
Steel companies of the United Kingdom
Former nationalised industries of the United Kingdom
Defunct companies based in Sheffield
Vickers